Nicholas Monroe and Aisam-ul-Haq Qureshi were the defending champions but only Monroe chose to defend his title, partnering Brian Baker. Monroe lost in the first round to Purav Raja and Divij Sharan.

Marcus Daniell and Marcelo Demoliner won the title after defeating Oliver Marach and Fabrice Martin 6–3, 6–4 in the final.

Seeds

Draw

References
 Main Draw

Irving Tennis Classic - Doubles
Irving Tennis Classic